Crossing Swords is an American stop-motion animated sitcom created by John Harvatine IV and Tom Root for Hulu. The series premiered on June 12, 2020. Six days after its premiere, the series was renewed for a second season, which premiered on December 10, 2021.

In June 2022, Harvatine IV announced that Hulu cancelled the series after two seasons.

Premise
Crossing Swords follows "Patrick, a goodhearted peasant who lands a coveted squire position at the royal castle. His dream job quickly turns into a nightmare when he learns his beloved kingdom is run by a hornet's nest of horny monarchs, crooks and charlatans. Even worse, Patrick's valor made him the black sheep in his family, and now his criminal siblings have returned to make his life hell. War, murder, full frontal nudity—who knew brightly colored peg people led such exciting lives?"

Cast and characters

Main
 Nicholas Hoult as the squire Patrick, the main protagonist
 Luke Evans as King Merriman
 Alanna Ubach as Queen Tulip, Merriman's wife
 Adam Pally as Broth, Patrick's best friend and fellow knight
 Tara Strong as Coral, Patrick's pirate sister
 Strong also voices Trina Franklin, a plucky peasant girl
 Tony Hale as Blarney, Patrick's clown brother
 Adam Ray as Ruben, Patrick's bandit brother
 Seth Green as Blinkerquartz, the Castle's Wizard
 Breckin Meyer as Glenn, Patrick’s father
 Wendi McLendon-Covey as Doreen, Patrick’s mother

Recurring
 Yvette Nicole Brown as Sgt. Meghan, trainer of the knights
 Maya Erskine as Princess Blossom, Merriman and Tulip's spoiled daughter
 Ben Schwartz as Keefer, Blossom's (dead) boyfriend
 Rob Corddry as The Old King, Merriman's insane father whom he dethroned
 Jameela Jamil as Sloane, who is a maid in the castle and Patrick's love interest.

Guest
 Alfred Molina as Robin Hood, Ruben's rival (Episode: "Hot Tub Death Machine")
 Natasha Lyonne as Norah, a Yeti. (Episode: "The Snow Job")
 Jane Lynch as Donna

Episodes

Season 1 (2020)

Season 2 (2021)

Production

Development
On September 27, 2018, it was announced that Hulu had given the production a series order for a first season consisting of ten episodes. The series was created by John Harvatine IV and Tom Root who were also expected to serve as executive producers. The series was  produced by Stoopid Buddy Stoodios and distributed by Sony Pictures Television. On June 18, 2020, Hulu renewed the series for a second season. On June 9, 2022, co-creator John Harvatine IV revealed the show was cancelled.

Casting
Alongside the series order announcement, it was confirmed that the series' voice cast would consist of Nicholas Hoult and Luke Evans, among others.

Reception
On Rotten Tomatoes, the first season holds a 27% approval rating based on reviews from 15 critics. The site's critics’ consensus reads, "Crass and cruel, Crossing Swords bleeds its thin premise dry". Metacritic, which uses a weighted average, gives it a score of 47 out of 100, indicating "mixed or average reviews".

References

External links
 

2020s American adult animated television series
2020s American animated comedy television series
2020s American black comedy television series
2020s American sitcoms
2020 American television series debuts
2021 American television series endings
2020s American LGBT-related animated television series
American stop-motion adult animated television series
American adult animated comedy television series
American adult animated fantasy television series
American animated sitcoms
English-language television shows
Hulu original programming
Television series by Sony Pictures Television
Television series by Stoopid Buddy Stoodios
Television series set in fictional countries